Chehinez Jemi  (born 29 April 1997) is a Tunisian karateka. She won the gold medal in the women's +68kg event at the 2019 African Games held in Rabat, Morocco.

Career 

She won the gold medal in her event at the 2019 African Karate Championships held in Gaborone, Botswana. She also won the silver medal in the women's team kumite event. She won the gold medal in the women's +68kg event at the 2019 African Games held in Rabat, Morocco.

In June 2021, she competed at the World Olympic Qualification Tournament held in Paris, France hoping to qualify for the 2020 Summer Olympics in Tokyo, Japan. In November 2021, she competed in the women's +68kg event at the World Karate Championships held in Dubai, United Arab Emirates where she was eliminated in her second match. In 2022, she won one of the bronze medals in the women's +68kg event at the Mediterranean Games held in Oran, Algeria. She defeated María Torres of Spain in her bronze medal match.

She won the bronze medal in the women's +68kg event at the 2022 World Games held in Birmingham, United States. She defeated Titta Keinänen of Finland in her bronze medal match. She won one of the bronze medals in the women's +68kg event at the 2021 Islamic Solidarity Games held in Konya, Turkey.

Achievements

References

External links 
 

Living people
1997 births
Place of birth missing (living people)
Tunisian female karateka
African Games medalists in karate
African Games gold medalists for Tunisia
Competitors at the 2019 African Games
Competitors at the 2022 Mediterranean Games
Mediterranean Games medalists in karate
Mediterranean Games bronze medalists for Tunisia
Competitors at the 2022 World Games
World Games bronze medalists
World Games medalists in karate
Islamic Solidarity Games medalists in karate
Islamic Solidarity Games competitors for Tunisia
21st-century Tunisian women